Frederick Sigfred Franck (April 12, 1909 in Maastricht, The Netherlands – June 5, 2006 in Warwick, New York, U.S.) was a painter, sculptor, and author of more than 30 books on Buddhism and other subjects, who was known for his interest in human spirituality. He became a United States citizen in 1945. He was a dental surgeon by trade, and worked with Dr. Albert Schweitzer in Africa from 1958 to 1961.

His sculptures are in the collections of the Museum of Modern Art, the Whitney Museum of American Art, the Fogg Art Museum, the Tokyo National Museum, and the Cathedral of St. John the Divine.

His major creation was a sculpture garden and park adjacent to his home in Warwick, New York, which he called Pacem in Terris ("Peace on Earth"). In 1959, he and his wife, Claske Berndes Franck, purchased the six-acre property, the site of an old grist mill which had become a dumping ground, for $800. They opened Pacem in Terris to the public in 1966. Dr. Franck dedicated it to Dr. Albert Schweitzer, Pope John XXIII, and the Buddhist teacher D.T. Suzuki. More than 70 sculptures adorn the property, which is now operated by a nonprofit foundation.

Bibliography
Messenger of the Heart: The Book of Angelus Silesius, with observations by the ancient Zen masters, (World Wisdom, 2005) 
The Buddha Eye: An Anthology of the Kyoto School and its Contemporaries, (World Wisdom, 2004) 
What Matters: Spiritual Nourishment for Head and Heart, (Skylight Paths Publishing, 2004) 
Ode to the Human Face: Seeing/Molding the Human Face As Meditation, (Codhill Press, 2004) 
A Passion for Seeing: On Being an Image Maker, (Codhill Press, 2003) 
A Zen Book of Hours, (Codhill Press, 2003) 
Seeing Venice: An Eye in Love : An Inner Travelogue With 94 Drawings, (Codhill Press, 2002) 
What Does It Mean to Be Human?, (St. Martin's Griffin, 2001) 
Pacem in Terris: A Love Story, (Codhill Press, 2000) 
Fingers Pointing Toward the Sacred: A Twentieth Century Pilgrimage on the Eastern and Western Way, (Beacon Point Press, 1994) 
Zen Seeing, Zen Drawing: Meditation in Action, (Bantam Books, 1993) 
A Little Compendium on That Which Matters, (St Martins Press, 1993) 
To Be Human Against All Odds: On the Reptile Still Active in Our Brain (Nanzan Studies in Religion and Culture), (Asian Humanities Pr, 1991) 
Life Drawing Life: On Seeing/Drawing the Human, (Great River Books, 1989) 
Echoes from the Bottomless Well, (Vintage, 1985) 
Art As a Way: A Return to the Spiritual Roots, (Crossroad Publishing Company, 1981) 
EveryOne: the timeless Myth of "Everyman" reborn, (Wildwood House Ltd, 1979) 
The Awakened Eye, (Vintage, 1979) 
An encounter with Oomoto "The great origin": A faith rooted in the ancient mysticism and the traditional arts of Japan, (Cross Currents, 1975)
Christ Equals Buddha, (Wildwood Ho, 1974) 
Zen of Seeing: Seeing/Drawing as Meditation, (Vintage, 1973) 
Simenon's Paris, (Dial Press, 1970)
Exploding church;: From Catholicism to Catholicism, (Delacorte Press, 1968)
My Eye is in Love: Revelations on the Act of Seeing by Drawing, (Macmillan, 1963)
African Sketchbook, (Peter Davies, 1962)
Days with Albert Schweitzer, (Peter Davies, 1959)
Open Wide, Please!, (Peter Davies, 1957)

References

External links

 Pacem in Terris website
 An overview about Frederick Frank and his work from SpiritualityandPractice.com's "Remembering Spiritual Masters" Project.
 An interview with some excerpts from his writing.
 over zijn werk en afbeeldingen van de kruisweg en het verhaal van de os Studentenkerk Nijmegen

1909 births
2006 deaths
Dutch emigrants to the United States
Dutch male sculptors
Buddhist writers
20th-century Dutch sculptors
20th-century Dutch painters
Dutch male painters
Artists from Maastricht
Buddhist artists
20th-century Dutch male artists